Elle-Máijá Apiniskim Tailfeathers (born in 1986) is a Blackfoot and Sámi filmmaker, actor, and producer from the Kainai First Nation in Canada. She has won several accolades for her film work, including multiple Canadian Screen Awards.

Born in Cardston, Alberta, Tailfeathers began acting in the late 2000s before embarking on a career as a filmmaker.

For directing The Body Remembers When the World Broke Open, she shared the Canadian Screen Award for Best Director with Kathleen Hepburn. That film also won the Toronto Film Critics Association's $100,000 Rogers Best Canadian Film Award.

Early life
Tailfeathers was born to Bjarne Store-Jakobsen, a Sámi rights activist and journalist from Norway, and Kainai activist and doctor Esther Tailfeathers, from Canada. Her parents met at a global indigenous peoples' conference in Australia, and married sometime after.

Career
Tailfeathers studied acting at the Vancouver Film School, and graduated in 2006 and then moved on to the University of British Columbia where she would graduate with a degree in First Nations studies and a minor in women and gender studies in 2011.

After acting for a period of time, Tailfeathers shifted her focus to filmmaking and began to work as a writer, director, and producer. During her time at the University of British Columbia she started to use film equipment and editing software.

Bloodland
Bloodland (2011) is an experimental short film that offers a commentary on fracking practices in Canada and across the world. It can be found on YouTube, where it was made public in 2013 in solidarity with the Idle No More movement. The short film uses metaphoric imagery of a woman being held down and drilled into as a comment on the current fracking practices in Canada. This project was funded by the Blood Tribe Chief and Council through a distribution cheque, and as a result was indirectly funded by the proceeds of various gas and oil companies, as well as KRI Resources. The film was well received at its premier in Lethbridge, and was the subject of a greater national debate regarding the practice of fracking in Indigenous lands.

The film was selected for the following film festivals:
 Vancouver International Film Festival 2011
 ImagineNATIVE Film Festival 2011
 American Indian Film Festival 2011
 L.A. Skins Festival 2011
 Tulsa International Film Festival 2011
 Yellowknife International Film Festival 2011
 Riddu Riđđu International Indigenous Peoples Festival 2011 (Norway)
 Vancouver Indigenous Media Arts Festival 2011
 Skábmagovat Film Festival 2012 (Finland)
 Vancouver Women in Film Festival 2012

A Red Girl's Reasoning
A Red Girl's Reasoning (2012)  is a short film that was created in response to the growing numbers of missing and murdered Indigenous women in Canada. This film centres around a survivor of sexual assault and her quest to bring justice to the attackers of her fellow women. While originally a short film, it is currently in the process of expanding into a feature film. This film was the winner of the 2012 Vancouver Crazy8s Competition, where filmmakers were challenged to create a film in under eight days.

Rebel (Bihttoš)
Rebel (Bihttoš) is an experimental and unconventional documentary where a young woman (Tailfeathers) explores her complex "relationship with her father through an examination of family photos and the family lore surrounding her parents’ courtship and marriage." Bihttoš combines "animation, re-enactments, and archival photos, [and] delves into the dissolution of her parents' mythic love story and how it has coloured her perception of love in her adult life."

Bihttoš first screened at the imagineNATIVE film festival in 2014.

cəsnaʔəm, the city before the city 
cəsnaʔəm, the city before the city (2017) is a feature film on the history of the land in the area which is now known as Vancouver. Made in partnership with Musqueam First Nation, the film was part of a larger exhibition put on in partnership with the Museum of Anthropology at UBC, the Museum of Vancouver and the Musqueam Cultural Centre.

The Body Remembers When the World Broke Open 
Co-directed with Kathleen Hepburn, The Body Remembers When the World Broke Open centres on the interaction between Áila (Tailfeathers), an indigenous woman with a stable and happy domestic life, and Rosie (Violet Nelson), a more impoverished First Nations woman who has just been a victim of domestic abuse, after they meet in the street. The majority of the film consists of one long, unbroken shot.

The film premiered at the 2019 Berlin Film Festival in the Generation program, and had its Canadian premiere at the 2019 Toronto International Film Festival. It was nominated for six Canadian Screen Awards, including Best Motion Picture, and won three.

For directing The Body Remembers When the World Broke Open, Tailfeathers shared the Canadian Screen Award for Best Director with Hepburn. That film also won the Toronto Film Critics Association's $100,000 Rogers Best Canadian Film Award.

Themes and issues
Her work has garnered attention for its focus on representations of women of colour, and her thematic focus on First Nations subjects and issues. Tailfeathers explores "innovative means of telling stories through mediums including narrative fiction, docudrama, documentary, mockumentary, and experimental film." Her film projects are usually staffed primarily with Indigenous cast and production members, reflecting her emphasis on engaging with First Nations and Indigenous filmmakers.

One of her primary focuses as a filmmaker is activism and social justice and approaches film as a way to "use it as a form of nonviolent direct action against issues like violence against women and degradation of Indigenous land." Her film and activist pursuits focus on issues that directly relate to and affect Indigenous women and communities.

Awards and recognition
She has won and been nominated for awards at various international film festivals, and has been recognized for her work rooted in social justice. Notable recognition has included receiving a Kodak Image Award, the Vancouver Mayor's Arts Award as an emerging filmmaker. She is included in CBC's  "Young Indigenous Leaders: 5 Under 30 To Watch in 2015." Her autobiographical short film Rebel (Bihttoš) was named one of the Top Ten short films at the 2014 Toronto International Film Festival. It was also awarded best documentary at the Seattle International Film Festival in 2015. In 2017, Tailfeathers won a Canadian Screen Award for best actress for a dramatic program or limited series for her work in the CBC movie Unclaimed, as well as an award for best performance at the Vancouver Women in Film Festival.

At the 2019 Vancouver International Film Festival, Tailfeathers and her co-director Kathleen Hepburn received the $25,000 Best BC Film Award for their film The Body Remembers When the World Broke Open. Tailfeathers also won the $17,500 BC Emerging Filmmaker Award.

At the 10th Canadian Screen Awards in 2022 she won the Canadian Screen Award for Best Actress for her performance in Night Raiders, and her documentary film Kímmapiiyipitssini: The Meaning of Empathy won the award for Best Feature Length Documentary.

Personal life 
Tailfeathers divides her time between Vancouver Canada, the Blood Reserve, and Sapmi territory in Norway.

She is active in advocating for issues affecting First Nations communities. In 2011, she was arrested for a participating in a peaceful blockade at the entrance of a drilling site in the Alberta Blood Reserve.

Filmography

References

External links

Living people
Kainai Nation people
Norwegian Sámi people
Canadian people of Sámi descent
Canadian women film directors
Vancouver Film School alumni
University of British Columbia alumni
First Nations filmmakers
First Nations actresses
Sámi actors
Canadian film actresses
Canadian television actresses
Canadian Screen Award winners
21st-century Canadian actresses
21st-century Canadian screenwriters
Canadian women screenwriters
Best Director Genie and Canadian Screen Award winners
Best Screenplay Genie and Canadian Screen Award winners
Canadian curators
Canadian women curators
First Nations screenwriters
1986 births
Best Actress Genie and Canadian Screen Award winners
Directors of Genie and Canadian Screen Award winners for Best Documentary Film
Canadian women documentary filmmakers